There are three flag designs associated with the English county of Wiltshire. Like the proposed flags of many other counties, two of the three have no official status as they were not designed by the College of Arms. One of the designs, the "Bustard Flag", was approved by a full meeting of the Wiltshire Council on 1 December 2009, as a county flag and subsequently registered with the Flag Institute.

Armorial banner

A banner of the arms of the former Wiltshire County Council has been commercially available for many years. It represents the council, rather than Wiltshire as a geographical area. In April 2009, the county council was merged with the old district councils of Wiltshire (Kennet, North Wilts, Salisbury and West Wilts) into a new unitary authority known as Wiltshire Council, and the arms of all of them passed to the successor authority. New green flags were created which have been flown from council buildings around the county, but these flags are not generally available to the public.

Bustard Flag
The "Bustard Flag" was created by Mike Prior and designed by Helen Pocock, a graphic designer, in 2007. It is partly based on the flag of the Wiltshire County Council, including the alternating stripes of green and white that represent the grassy downs of the county and their chalk underlay. The colours can represent hope, joy and safety (green) and peace (white). Although distinct, the complicated and irregular design has been met with some criticism by flag designers and heraldists.

An image of the great bustard (Otis tarda) stands at the centre of the flag. This bird had been extinct in England since 1832, but is now part of an intensive ten-year breeding programme on Salisbury Plain. Salisbury Plain, at the heart of the county, is one of only two areas in Great Britain in which the great bustard originally lived, the other being the sandy brecklands of eastern England (Norfolk and Suffolk). On the flag, the male great bustard is depicted in gold on a solid green circle to represent the open grassland. The border of the circle, in six sections alternating green and white, represents the stone circles of Stonehenge and Avebury in the county. The six portions also represent the six surrounding counties of Gloucestershire, Oxfordshire, Berkshire, Hampshire, Dorset and Somerset.

The technical specification of the flag is that it is a 3:5 ratio, and is manufactured in green and gold onto a white material.

Although Mike Prior admits that there "is no method or authority to get it accepted as the county flag of Wiltshire, that is all done by public acceptance.", the flag received the support of Wiltshire County Council, and was flown at Wiltshire County Hall in Trowbridge in June 2007.

The Bustard Flag was first raised in Trowbridge by Lord Bath in September 2006 and was later flown by Jane Scott, leader of the former county council, at County Hall, Trowbridge, on 5 June 2007.

At a full meeting of the Wiltshire Council on 1 December 2009, the Bustard Flag was formally approved as the county flag.

June 2011 saw the Wiltshire Flag flown for one week above the Department of Communications government building in London. This was highly and positively publicised by Matthew Smith on BBC Wiltshire radio breakfast show.

White Horse Flag

The White Horse Flag was designed in 2006 by Chrys Fear, who asserted that the white horse symbol as found in the context of hillside chalk carvings across the county – most famously the Westbury White Horse and the Cherhill White Horse – was an image of greater cultural connection to Wiltshire. Fear's design incorporated the sketch of the Cherhill White Horse found in William Plenderleath's The White Horses of the West of England published in 1885 placing it on a green background.

Fear's design was never offered to the county's officials for their review and approval, but the campaign aimed for the flag's popular adoption by local people and emphasised its free, public and uncopyrighted status. As of May 2010 the website vanished, the campaign apparently over following Wiltshire Council's adoption of the bustard design.

See also
Hill figure

References

External links
[ Flag Institute registration particulars]

Culture in Wiltshire
Wiltshire
Wiltshire
Wiltshire